Pairing Off is an album by saxophonist Phil Woods' Septet recorded in 1956 and released on the Prestige label.

Reception

In his review for Allmusic, Scott Yanow stated "The full group stretches out on four lengthy numbers".

Track listing
All compositions by Phil Woods except as indicated
 "The Stanley Stomper" - 14:20   
 "Cool Aid" - 9:47   
 "Pairing Off" - 12:15   
 "Suddenly It's Spring" (Johnny Burke, Jimmy Van Heusen) - 8:22

Personnel
Phil Woods, Gene Quill - alto saxophone 
Donald Byrd, Kenny Dorham - trumpet
Tommy Flanagan - piano
Doug Watkins - bass 
Philly Joe Jones - drums

References

Prestige Records albums
Phil Woods albums
1956 albums
Albums recorded at Van Gelder Studio
Albums produced by Bob Weinstock